Leschenaultia, or Leschenaultia is the name of plants, animals, and places that refer to Jean-Baptiste Leschenault de La Tour
 Leschenaultia, a genus of insects in the family  Tachinidae
 Leschenaultia, a spelling variant and synonym of the plant genus Lechenaultia
 Leschenault's leaf-toed gecko
 Lake Leschenaultia, a lake in Western Australia